Vivian Zapata was selected as the official artist of the 6th Annual Latin Grammy Awards held in Los Angeles CA.

Zapata's artwork was used as the official image for the event.

References

External links
 Vivian Zapata.com

21st-century American artists
Living people
Year of birth missing (living people)